This is a list of warships of the Royal Scots Navy, the navy of the Kingdom of Scotland prior to the Acts of Union 1707. For its continuation after this period, see List of ship names of the Royal Navy.

Ships

 unnamed man-of-war c1329 
 King's Carvel (Yellow Carvel) 1475 
 Flower 1470s 
 Christopher 1490s - man-of-war 
  Lion early 16th century  converted merchant vessel owned by Robert Barton of Over Barnton
 Jenny Pirwin early 16th century 
 Eagle (1502)
 Towaich (1502)
 Colomb (1504) - hired by Robert Barton
 Treasurer (1504) - a converted merchant vessel likely named for Robert Barton, who was Treasurer of Scotland and responsible for commissioning the vessel
 Margaret (1505) - named after Margaret Tudor
 Unicorn (1505)
 James (1511)
 Michael (Great Michael) (1511); a 1000-ton Carrack sold to France 1514  - named after archangel Michael
 Mary Willoughby c. 1535, captured from the English, and used in the Scots Navy until she was recaptured. Named after Maria Willoughby, friend of Catherine of Aragon and wife of reigning monarch Henry VIII of England
 Salamander of Leith, 1537, Flagship of James V of Scotland, gift of Francis I of France
 Lamb of Glasgow 1690 - converted merchant ship
 Pelican (hired 1689) 18 guns ship captured by the French 10 July 1689; re-captured 1690 by the English Navy and renamed Pelican Prize (as fireship), sunk as breakwater in 1692 off Sheerness.
 Janet (hired 1689) 12 guns ship captured by the French 10 July 1689; fate unknown.
 Royal William (1696) - a Fifth-rate 32-gun frigate. Flagship of Captain Thomas Gordon, Commodore of the Navy. Became HMS Edinburgh in 1707; William III
 Royal Mary (1696) - a Sixth-rate 24 gun frigate. Captain James Hamilton. Became HMS Glasgow in 1707; like named for Mary II
 Dumbarton Castle (1696) - a Sixth-rate Frigate, retained its name as HMS Dumbarton Castle in 1707

The final three ships above were added to the Royal Navy following the Act of Union in 1707.

See also
 List of early warships of the English Navy

References

Rif Winfield (2009), British Warships in the Age of Sail 1603-1714: Design, Construction, Careers & Fates. Seaforth Publishing. .

Lists of sailing ships
Military units and formations of Scotland
Royal Scots Navy